Isaac Morales Domínguez (born 6 August 1980) is a Mexican football manager and former player. He was born in Mexico City.

References

External links

1980 births
Living people
Mexican footballers
Association football defenders
Atlante F.C. footballers
C.F. Pachuca players
Liga MX players
Footballers from Mexico City
Querétaro F.C. non-playing staff